The Araluen Cultural Precinct, formerly the Araluen Centre for Arts & Entertainment, in Alice Springs in the Northern Territory of Australia, is a cultural precinct which includes the  Araluen Arts Centre, the Museum of Central Australia (incorporating the Strehlow Research Centre), Central Australian Aviation Museum, Kookaburra Memorial, Yeperenye Sculpture, Central Craft, a cafe, and Aboriginal sacred sites.

Art centre
The Araluen Arts Centre features four art galleries (including the Albert Namatjira Gallery) and a significant collection of art from across the region. Each year it holds Central Australia's largest First Nations art event, Desert Mob. Live performances of drama, dance and music as well as international and independent movies are shown in the theatre, which seats about five hundred people.

The front window to the arts portion of the centre is a massive, locally-made, stained glass work of art.

Artists whose work has regularly been exhibited at the Araluen Centre include Daisy Jugadai Napaltjarri.

Other components

The Museum of Central Australia incorporates the Strehlow Research Centre for Aboriginal Culture, and displays many locally found minerals, describes geologic formations of the area.

Nearby is the Central Australian Aviation Museum, with planes and radio equipment, which is also home to the local ham radio group.

Central Craft is a crafts centre with a contemporary crafts shop and gallery, complete with ceramics, stained glass, painting and fabric-working workshops on site. Travelling art displays are a frequent attraction and celebrations, such as the annual Beanie Festival, are also held there.

References

External links 
 

Museums in Alice Springs
Arts centres in Australia
Art museums and galleries in the Northern Territory